Halloween Havoc is a professional wrestling event currently produced by WWE for the company's developmental brand, NXT. As the name implies, it is a Halloween-themed show held in October. 

It was originally produced as an annual pay-per-view (PPV) by World Championship Wrestling (WCW) from 1989 until 2000. The first two events were held when WCW was still affiliated with the National Wrestling Alliance (NWA) before WCW split from the NWA in January 1991. The final five events under WCW (1996–2000) were held at the MGM Grand Garden Arena in the Las Vegas suburb of Paradise, Nevada.

WWE – at that time still known as the World Wrestling Federation – purchased the assets of WCW in March 2001. Nineteen years later, Halloween Havoc was revived as an annual event for WWE's NXT brand in 2020. In 2020 and 2021, it was held as a television special of the NXT program, but was made a livestreaming event in 2022.

History
In 1989, World Championship Wrestling (WCW) of the National Wrestling Alliance (NWA) scheduled a Halloween-themed pay-per-view (PPV) event for October 28, 1989, at the Philadelphia Civic Center in Philadelphia, Pennsylvania. The event was aptly named Halloween Havoc. A second Halloween Havoc was scheduled for the following year, thus establishing Halloween Havoc as an annual PPV for WCW. This second event was also the final Halloween Havoc produced by WCW under the NWA banner as WCW split from the NWA in January 1991.

The 2000 event was the final Halloween Havoc produced by WCW, as in March 2001, WCW was acquired by the World Wrestling Federation (WWF); the WWF was renamed to World Wrestling Entertainment (WWE) in 2002 ("WWE" became an orphaned initialism in 2011). After 19 years since the acquisition of WCW, WWE revived Halloween Havoc for their developmental brand, NXT. Both the 2020 and 2021 events were held as television special episodes of the NXT television program, which aired on the USA Network. The 2022 event, however, will be held as a livestreaming event, airing on Peacock in the United States and the WWE Network in international markets.

The 1994 and 1995 events were both held at the Joe Louis Arena in Detroit, Michigan before becoming a main stay at the MGM Grand Garden Arena in the Las Vegas suburb of Paradise, Nevada from 1996 to 2000. Since the event's revival in 2020, it has been held at NXT's home venue, the WWE Performance Center in Orlando, Florida.

In 2014, all WCW PPVs, including Halloween Havoc, were made available on WWE's streaming service, the WWE Network. Since March 2021, they are also available on Peacock in the United States as the American version of the WWE Network merged under Peacock at that time.

Events

Notes

References

External links
 Results at ProWrestlingHistory.com
 Results and coverage at OWW
 Halloween Havoc '89 Review at Geexplosion.com

 
Professional wrestling in the Las Vegas Valley
Recurring events established in 1989
Recurring events disestablished in 2000
Recurring events established in 2020